Marta Simlat, known as J.K. (born 2 January 1970) is a Polish model and eurodance "singer" who enjoyed moderate success in the mid- to late-1990s with the Italian producers Larry Pignagnoli and Davide Riva.

Musical career
Simlat moved from Poland to Italy in 1992 to pursue a modelling career. However, shortly after her move she was spotted by Larry Pignagnoli and Davide Riva, the production team behind Whigfield. Simlat was quickly signed to and her first single, "You Make Me Feel Good", performed well in France, Italy and Germany and topped the dance charts in Canada.

Her third single, "You and I", climbed to the top position on the Canadian dance charts and obtained strong airplay in continental Europe. The track was also used on many dance compilation albums around the globe, including Muchmusic's Dance Mix '95 and the Eurodisco '96 - Collection. A fourth single, "My Radio", took Europe by storm and also became popular in Japan.

Although J.K.'s last official single, "Deep in the Night", was released in 1999, the Benassi Bros made two cover versions of J.K. songs with the vocalist Dhany in 2005 titled "Hit My Heart" and "Make Me Feel". Most singles were only released in Italy.

In reality, the vocals for J.K. were performed by Giovanna Bersola, Sandy Chambers and Zeitia Massiah on all the songs. Lip sync was performed on videos and live performances by Simlat. It was proven that Simlat was actually lip-syncing when she forgot to turn her microphone off during the beginning of "My Radio (70's)" on Dance Machine 9. Her real voice was revealed, which was not the one behind the performance of the songs. After her last official single, "You Got Me Dancing" in 2000, Simlat disappeared from the public eye and left the J.K. project (probably due to the proven lip-sync allegations) leaving J.K. in the void.

Discography

Albums
Sweet Lady Night (The Special Edition) (1996)

Singles

References

External Links
 https://www.discogs.com/artist/43674-JK

1970 births
Living people
Polish women singers
Polish fraudsters
Eurodance musicians
Music controversies
Musical hoaxes
Entertainment scandals